European route E10 is the second shortest Class A road which is part of the International E-road network. It begins in Å, Norway and ends in Luleå, Sweden. The road is about 850 km (530 mi) in length. The Norwegian part of the road is also named Kong Olav Vs vei (King Olav V's road).

The road follows the route Å – Leknes – Svolvær – Gullesfjordbotn – Evenes – Bjerkvik – Kiruna – Töre – Luleå.
Most of the road is paved and two-lane, with the exception of some bridges between islands in Nordland. It has a  speed limit in Sweden, and is usually 7-8 meters wide, enough to make encounters between heavy vehicles trouble-free. Often, the  width makes encounters between heavy vehicles tight. Buses and caravans should avoid driving here, but many of them do so anyway.

The name E10 was given in 1992. Before 1985, E10 was the name of the road Paris-Brussels-Amsterdam-Groningen. The road between Narvik and Kiruna was finished in 1984, before that, no road existed at all directly between the two cities; the only way to travel between them was by train (with passenger services only three times a day), or by a large detour through Finland. In 2007, the road near Lofoten was shortened by about 30 km, and the ferry-service was bypassed for E10, with the opening of Lofast, a new road between Fiskebøl and Gullesfjordbotn. At the end of 2007, the E10 has 18 tunnels totalling , all in Norway.

References

External links 
 UN Economic Commission for Europe: Overall Map of E-road Network (2007)

10
E010
E010
National Tourist Routes in Norway

Roads within the Arctic Circle